Jurandir is both a given name and a surname. Notable people with the name include:

 Jurandir (footballer, 1912-1972), full name Jurandir Corrêa dos Santos, Brazilian football goalkeeper
 Jurandir (footballer, born 1938), full name Álvaro Vilela Jurandir, Brazilian football defender
 Jurandir (footballer,1940-1996), full name Jurandir de Freitas, Brazilian football centre-back